Alice Robb is a writer. Her first book Why We Dream is about the science of dreaming. She regularly contributes book reviews to New Statesman. Her second book, a memoir, Don't Think, Dear, about loving and leaving ballet is published in Spring 2023.

Bibliography

Books
 
 Don't Think, Dear

Book reviews

References 

Year of birth missing (living people)
Living people
New Statesman people